The 1946 Ohio Athletic Conference football season was the season of college football played by the 21 member schools of the Ohio Athletic Conference (OAC), commonly referred to as the "Ohio Conference", as part of the 1946 college football season. 

The Otterbein Cardinals, in their first season under head coach George Novotny, won the OAC championship with a 7–1 record (5–0 against OAC opponents). The Cardinals shut out four opponents and gave up an average of only 4.75 points per game. Two Otterbein players (halfback Paul Davis and center Ralph Pickelsimer) were selected as first-team players on the 1946 All-Ohio Conference team.

The Toledo Rockets, led by first-year head coach Bill Orwig, finished in second place with a 6–2–2 record (4–0 against OAC opponents), including a victory over Bates in the first annual Glass Bowl game.

Three of the conference's head coaches, each serving their first year as a college head coach, were later inducted into the College Football Hall of Fame: Woody Hayes at Denison, Paul Hoernemann at Heidelberg, and Ed Sherman at Muskingum.

Conference overview

Teams

Otterbein

The 1946 Otterbein Cardinals football team represented Otterbein University. In their first season under head coach George Novotny, the Cardinals compiled a 7–1 record (5–0 against OAC opponent), won the OAC championship, shut out four of eight opponents, and outscored all opponents by a total of 278 to 38.

Halfback Paul Davis and center Ralph Pickelsimer were named to the 1946 All-OAC football team.

Toledo

In their first season under head coach Bill Orwig, the Rockets compiled a 6–2–2 record, outscored their opponents by a combined total of 200 to 132, and defeated Bates, 21–12, in the first postseason Glass Bowl game.

Oberlin

The 1946 Oberlin Yeomen football team represented Oberlin College of Oberlin, Ohio. In their 17th season under head coach Lysle K. Butler, the Cardinals compiled a 4–2–1 record (2–0 against OAC opponents), finished in third place in the OAC, and outscored all opponents by a total of 136 to 46.

Muskingum

The 1946 Muskingum Fighting Muskies football team represented Muskingum University of New Concord, Ohio. In their second season under head coach Ed Sherman, the Fighting Muskies compiled a 5–3–1 record (4–0–1 against OAC opponents), finished in fourth place in the OAC, and outscored all opponents by a total of 122 to 115.

Baldwin–Wallace

The 1946  Baldwin–Wallace Yellow Jackets football team represented Baldwin Wallace University of Berea, Ohio. In their 19th season under head coach Ray E. Watts, the Yellow Jackets compiled a 4–2–2 record (4–1 against OAC opponents), finished in fifth place in the OAC, and outscored opponents by a total of 163 to 73.

Mount Union

The 1946  Mount Union Purple Raiders football team represented the University of Mount Union of Alliance, Ohio. In their second season under head coach Pete Pederson, the Purple Raiders compiled a 7–1–1 record (5–1–1 against OAC opponents), finished in sixth place in the OAC, and outscored opponents by a total of 127 to 51.

Findlay

The 1946 Findlay Oilers football team represented the University of Findlay of Findlay, Ohio. Led by head coach Nelson M. Jones, the Oilers compiled a 6–2 record (3–1 against OAC opponents), finished in a tie for seventh place in the OAC, shut out five of eight opponents, and outscored all opponents by a total of 209 to 25.

Marietta

The 1946 Marietta Pioneers football team represented the Marietta College of Marietta, Ohio. Led by head coach Leonard Barnum, the Pioneers compiled a 3–4 record (3–1 against OAC opponents), finished in a tie for seventh place in the OAC, scored 68 point, and gave up 68 points.

Heidelberg

The 1946 Heidelberg Student Princes football team represented the Heidelberg University of Tiffin, Ohio. In their first season under head coach Paul Hoernemann, the Student Princes compiled a 5–2–1 record (5–2–1 against OAC opponents), finished in ninth place in the OAC, and outscored opponents by a total of 100 to 68.

Kent State

In their first season under head coach Trevor J. Rees, the Golden Flashes compiled a 6–2 record and ranked fourth nationally among small-college teams with an average of 349.1 yards per game in total offense. They also ranked fourth nationally in total defense, giving up an average of only 115.1 yards per game.

Akron

In their first season under head coach Paul Baldacci, the Zippers compiled a 5–4 record and were outscored by a total of 134 to 122.

Wittenberg

The 1946 Wittenberg Tigers football team represented the Wittenberg University of Springfield, Ohio. Led by head coach H.E. Maurer, the Tigers compiled a 3–5 record (3–4 against OAC opponents), finished in a tie for 11th place in the OAC, and were outscored opponents by a total of 105 to 87.

Ashland

The 1946 Ashland Eagles football team represented Ashland University of Ashland, Ohio. Led by head coach George Donges, the Tigers compiled a 2–5–1 record (2–3–1 against OAC opponents), finished in 13th place in the OAC, and were outscored opponents by a total of 114 to 57.

Wooster

The 1946 Wooster Fighting Scots football team represented the College of Wooster of Wooster, Ohio. Led by head coach John M. Swigart, the Fighting Scots compiled a 2–4–2 record (2–4–2 against OAC opponents), finished in 14th place in the OAC, and were outscored opponents by a total of 115 to 85.

Denison

The 1946 Denison Big Red football team represented Denison University of Granville, Ohio. The Big Red compiled a 2–6 record (2–4 against OAC opponents), finished in 15th place in the OAC, and was outscored by a total of 136 to 89.

Woody Hayes, at age 33, was hired as Denison's head coach in March 1946. It was his first collegiate head coaching job. He had been a high school coach before World War II and served as athletic officer at the Naval Academy in 1942.

John Carroll

The 1946 John Carroll Blue Streaks football team represented John Carroll University of University Heights, Ohio. In their first year under head coach Eugene Oberst, the Blue Streaks compiled a 1–7 record (1–4 against OAC opponents), finished in a tie for 16th place in the OAC, and were outscored by a total of 150 to 70.

Case

The 1946 Case Rough Riders football team represented Case School of Applied Science (now part of Case Western Reserve University). In their 17th year under head coach Ray A. Ride, the Rough Riders compiled a 2–7 record (1–4 against OAC opponents), finished in a tie for 16th place in the OAC, and were outscored by a total of 190 to 77.

Kenyon

The 1946 Kenyon Lords football team represented Kenyon College of Gambier, Ohio. Led by head coach D.C. Henderson, the Lords compiled a 1–7 record (1–5 against OAC opponents), finished in 18th place in the OAC, and were outscored by a total of 130 to 44.

Capital

The 1946 Capital Crusaders football team represented Capital University of Columbus, Ohio. Led by head coach Dale Rose, the Crusaders compiled a 1–6 record (1–6 against OAC opponents), finished in 19th place in the OAC, and were outscored by a total of 155 to 39.

Ohio Northern

The 1946 Ohio Northern Polar Bears football team represented Ohio Northern University of Ada, Ohio. Led by head coach Millard Murphy, the Polar Bears compiled a 3–6 record (0–6 against OAC opponents), finished in 20th place in the OAC, and were outscored by a total of 130 to 108.

Wilmington

The 1946 Wilmington Quakers football team represented Wilmington College of Wilmington, Ohio. Led by head coach Harold S. Shelly, the Quakers compiled a 0–5 record (0–2 against OAC opponents), finished in last place in the OAC, and were outscored by a total of 108 to 18.

All-conference team
The Associated Press selected a 1946 All-Ohio Conference football team consisting of the following players:

 Backs: Kenneth Funk, Ashland; Paul Davis, Otterbein; Lee Tressell, Baldwin-Wallace; Vince Marotta  Mount Union
 Ends: Joe Papp, Akron; McKey Thomas, Baldwin-Wallace
 Tackles: Ted Zuchowski, Toledo; Owen Ziebold, Findlay
 Guards: Frank Mesek, Kent State; Art Burton, Findlay
 Center: Ralph Pickeleseimer, Otterbein

References

 
Ohio Athletic Conference football